Bhatnagar is a surname native to India, prevalent mainly among the Hindu Kayasthas.

Notable people with the surname
 Arun Bhatnagar, former Indian Administrative Service officer
 Arvind Bhatnagar (1936–2006), Indian astronomer; founder-director of the Udaipur Solar Observatory and the Nehru Planetarium of Bombay
 Deepti Bhatnagar, Indian model and actor. 
 Divya Bhatnagar (1986–2020), Indian television actress
 Gopal Bhatnagar, Canadian surgeon
 Jitendra Bhatnagar, Indian cricketer
 Kanta Kumari Bhatnagar, Indian judge and human rights activist
 Mahendra Bhatnagar (1926–2020), Indian poet
 Prabhu Lal Bhatnagar (1912–1976), Indian mathematician known for Bhatnagar–Gross–Krook operator
 Rahul Bhatnagar, Indian Administrative Service officer
 Ram Ratan Bhatnagar, Indian Hindi-language scholar and professor at University of Sagar
 S. K. Bhatnagar, former defence secretary of India
 Samiksha Bhatnagar, Indian actress
 Seema Bhatnagar, Indian Women Scientist, working in the field of anticancer drug discovery.
 Shanti Swarup Bhatnagar (1894–1955), Indian scientist
 Shinjini Bhatnagar, Indian pediatric gastroenterologist
 Shivani Bhatnagar (died 1999), Indian Express journalist
 Shriya Saran Bhatnagar, aka Shriya Indian model and actress
 Veena Bhatnagar, Fijian politician
 Vibha Bhatnagar, India-born London-based entrepreneur
 Vikram Bhatnagar, Indian shooter

References

Kayastha
Indian surnames